Michal Nehoda (born 14 November 1976) is a retired Czech football forward. He played in the Gambrinus liga for numerous clubs, making over 100 league appearances in total. He played football in Cyprus for Ethnikos Achna before returning to the Czech Republic to play for Zlín in 2002.

Nehoda played international football at under-21 level for Czech Republic U21.

References

External links

1976 births
Living people
Czech footballers
Czech Republic under-21 international footballers
Czech First League players
Cypriot First Division players
FK Hvězda Cheb players
FK Viktoria Žižkov players
FK Drnovice players
SK Dynamo České Budějovice players
1. FK Příbram players
FC Fastav Zlín players
Ethnikos Achna FC players
Czech expatriate footballers
Expatriate footballers in Cyprus
Association football forwards
Footballers from Prague